The 2021 Arctic X-Prix was an Extreme E off-road race that was held on 28 and 29 August 2021 in Russell Glacier, near Kangerlussuaq, Greenland. It was the third round of the electric off-road racing car series' inaugural season, and marked the first ever motorsport event held in Greenland. The final was won by Catie Munnings and Timmy Hansen for the Andretti United Extreme E team, ahead of JBXE and Acciona  Sainz XE Team.

Classification

Qualifying

Notes:
 Tie-breakers were determined by Super Sector times.
  – Team awarded 5 additional points for being fastest in the Super Sector.

Semi-final 1

Semi-final 2

Crazy Race

Final

References

External links
 

|- style="text-align:center"
|width="35%"|Previous race:2021 Ocean X-Prix
|width="30%"|Extreme E Championship2021 season
|width="35%"|Next race:2021 Island X-Prix
|- style="text-align:center"
|width="35%"|Previous race:N/A
|width="30%"|Arctic X-Prix
|width="35%"|Next race:N/A
|- style="text-align:center"

Arctic X-Prix
Arctic X-Prix
Arctic X-Prix